Love's Sacrifice is a 1914 American short silent Western film directed by George Osborne and featuring William Ehfe, Tsuru Aoki, Black Bull and Virginia Philley Withey in important roles.

References

External links 

 

1914 films
1914 Western (genre) films
1914 drama films
1914 short films
American silent short films
American black-and-white films
Films directed by George Osborne
Silent American Western (genre) films
1910s American films
1910s English-language films